Chaparral High School, colloquially known as Chap, is a public, 4-year comprehensive high school in Temecula, California, United States. The school serves students in grades 9 through 12 and is one of five high schools in the Temecula Valley Unified School District.

History
The school opened in 1997 with a class of freshmen and sophomores, and added juniors the following year and seniors after that, graduating its first class in 2000. It was the second comprehensive high school built in the Temecula Valley Unified School District, after Temecula Valley, and was constructed at a cost of $36 million. The puma was chosen over the cougar for the school mascot, and platinum was chosen for a school color instead of flat silver. It was also named a California Gold Ribbon School in 2017.

The school became the subject of media attention after it cooperated with the local police in orchestrating an undercover drug sting which resulted in the arrest of an autistic teenager.

Demographics

According to U.S. News & World Report, 66% of Chaparral's student body are minorities, with 30% of the student body coming from economically disadvantaged households, as determined by student eligibility for California's reduced-price meal program.

Athletics
The school's construction included an Olympic-sized pool, to be shared with Temecula Valley High. Puma athletic teams compete in the Southwestern League. The football team won a CIF championship in 2009.

Performing arts
CHS fields two competitive show choirs, the mixed-gender "Platinum FX" and the all-female "Dynamics". The school also has an all-male group, "Forte". The program also hosts an annual competition.

Notable alumni 
 Rob Brantly, professional baseball player
 Allen Craig, professional baseball player
 Tyler Glenn, lead singer of the band Neon Trees
 Sarah Hammer, Olympic track cycler
 Tyler Hansen, professional football player
 Shane Peterson, professional baseball player

References

External links
 

High schools in Riverside County, California
Public high schools in California
Temecula, California
1997 establishments in California
Educational institutions established in 1997